"Operator, Operator" (also titled "Heart on the Line (Operator, Operator)") is a country music song co-written and recorded by Larry Willoughby, a cousin of country music singer Rodney Crowell, and Janet Willoughby. He released the song in 1983 from the album Building Bridges, and took it to number 65 on the Hot Country Songs charts. The Oak Ridge Boys also recorded it under the original title, as the b-side to their 1983 single "Love Song".

A 1985 recording by Eddy Raven, under the title "Operator, Operator", appeared on his album Love and Other Hard Times. This version went to number 9 on the same chart. Two versions of Raven's version were issued: One has a standard fade during the reprisal of the refrain, the other has a slightly different transition into the final refrain, with Raven – after being cut off – screaming into the phone that he has no more change to continue the call, with that track being played over Raven singing.

Chart performance

Larry Willoughby

Eddy Raven

References

1983 singles
1985 singles
1983 songs
The Oak Ridge Boys songs
Larry Willoughby songs
Eddy Raven songs
Song recordings produced by Paul Worley
RCA Records Nashville singles
Songs written by Larry Willoughby
Songs about telephone calls